The Québec Carnavals were a Minor League Baseball team located in Quebec City that served as the Montreal Expos' Double-A Eastern League affiliate from 1971 to 1977. They became known as the Québec Metros for the 1976 and 1977 seasons. Following the 1977 season, the Expos moved their Double-A affiliation to the Memphis Chicks, an expansion team of the Southern League.

History 
In 1969, the Montreal Expos were founded as members of the National League as Major League Baseball expanded to 24 teams. Filling out their minor league roster, Montreal announced that Quebec City would host the club's farm system. This was the Expos' first sole Double-A affiliate after sharing the Jacksonville Suns with the Milwaukee Brewers in 1970. Quebec joined fellow Canadian franchise, the Trois-Rivières Aigles, as new members of the Eastern League.

Season-by-season record

Defunct Eastern League (1938–present) teams
Defunct baseball teams in Canada
Baseball in Quebec City
Baseball teams in Quebec
Sports teams in Quebec City
Montreal Expos minor league affiliates